Capilla Peak Observatory was an astronomical observatory built in 1947 and owned and operated by the University of New Mexico (UNM). It had a  Cassegrain reflecting telescope built by Boller and Chivens and was equipped with a CCD. The mirror was sold and removed in 2016.

See also
 List of astronomical observatories

References

External links
 Institute for Astrophysics at UNM
 Capilla Peak Observatory Clear Sky Clock Forecasts of observing conditions

Astronomical observatories in New Mexico
University of New Mexico
Buildings and structures in Torrance County, New Mexico